UD-3 was an . The boat was laid down as the Dutch submarine HNLMS K XXV and renamed HNLMS O 25 but was captured during the German invasion of the Netherlands in World War II and commissioned in the Kriegsmarine.

Ship history
The submarine was ordered on 28 June 1938 and laid down on 10 April 1939 as K XXV at the Wilton-Fijenoord, Rotterdam. During construction she was renamed O 25, and was finally launched on 1 May 1940. Following the German invasion of 10 May 1940, O 25 was scuttled in the Nieuwe Waterweg near Rotterdam because there was no tugboat available to tow her to the United Kingdom.

The boat was raised by the Germans and it was decided to repair and complete her. She served in the Kriegsmarine as UD-3 and was commissioned  on 8 June 1941.

From June to July 1941 UD-3 served as a trial boat in Kiel while attached to the 3rd Flotilla. In June she was transferred to the 5th Flotilla also in Kiel where she was used as a school boat. She remained there until August that year. From August 1941 until September 1942 the boat was stationed at Lorient in occupied France and attached to the 2nd Flotilla. In October 1942 she was transferred to 10th Flotilla also in Lorient where she served until February 1943.

When patrolling off the west coast of Africa UD-3 spotted and sank the  Norwegian freighter Indra  on 26 November 1942.

In March 1943 the boat was transferred to Bergen in occupied Norway and attached to the U-boot Abwehr Schule to be used as school boat until October 1944.
On 13 October 1944, UD-3 was decommissioned after being damaged in an air raid on Kiel. On 3 May 1945 the boat was scuttled.

Summary of raiding history

References

Bibliography

1939 ships
World War II submarines of the Netherlands
World War II submarines of Germany
O 21-class submarines
Naval ships of the Netherlands captured by Germany during World War II
Maritime incidents in May 1940
Maritime incidents in May 1945
Operation Regenbogen (U-boat)
Submarines built by Wilton-Fijenoord